Naina Singh (born 4 March 1994) is an Indian model and television actress known for winning Splitsvilla 10 and playing Rhea Mehra in Kumkum Bhagya. In 2020, she participated in the reality show Bigg Boss 14.

Early life
Singh is a state level table tennis champion. Since her school days, she has played all kinds of sports including cricket, football, basketball and volleyball. She was an assistant casting director before participating in Splitsvilla 10.

Career
In 2013, Singh was crowned Femina's Most Stylish Diva. In 2017, she participated in MTV India's dating reality show Splitsvilla 10 where she finished as the winner with Baseer Ali. Next, she starred in her first music video titled Sundowner, sung by Avi J and Jyotica Tangri.

In 2018, she participated in Star Plus's talent reality show India's Next Superstars and emerged as a finalist.

In 2019, she portrayed Rhea Mehra in Zee TV's drama series Kumkum Bhagya. In February 2020, Singh quit the show stating she couldn't relate to the character at all, the kind of emotions she was portraying were not justified and she couldn't play the part anymore.

In October 2020, she participated as a wild card in Colors TV's reality competition show Bigg Boss 14. In 2021, she starred in the music video Wajah, sung by Ashwani Sharma. Next, she starred in the music video Melody, sung by Prince Narula.

Filmography

Films

Television

Music videos

References

External links
 

Living people
Indian television actresses
Actresses from Uttar Pradesh
People from Moradabad
1995 births
Bigg Boss (Hindi TV series) contestants